KZFX (93.7 FM, "Z-93.7") is a commercial radio station that is licensed to Ridgecrest, California and serves the area along US-395 from Ridgecrest to Lone Pine. The station is owned and programmed by Chuck Contreras and broadcasts a classic rock format.

History
The station was first signed on in July 2012 as KKYT and aired a country music format branded "The Coyote". This lasted until September 25, 2013, when the station flipped to classic rock. On November 16, 2013, the station changed its call sign to KZFX. The KZFX call sign had been previously used from 1986 to 1994 by  Z107 in Houston, Texas.

The station features programming such as California Headline News, Breakfast with the Beatles and Floydian Slip.

References

External links

ZFX
Ridgecrest, California